Jeliz Jand (also Romanized as Jelīz Jand, Jalaz Jand, Jalezjand, and Jelezjand) is a village in Shahrabad Rural District, in the Central District of Firuzkuh County, Tehran Province, Iran. At the 2006 census, its population was 589, in 181 families.

References 

Populated places in Firuzkuh County